Ministry of Economy and Trade (MOET;) is a governmental ministry of Lebanon, headquartered on the 5th floor of the Azarieh Building in Beirut.

The position is currently held by Amin Salam as of September 2021.

References

External links
 Ministry of Economy and Trade
 Ministry of Economy and Trade 

Government ministries of Lebanon
Trade ministries